The Sultanate of Bambao was a state on the island of Grande Comore. Its capital was the town of Iconi. In 1886, Sultan Said Ali bin Said Omar of Anjouan united the sultanates of Grand Comore into the state of Ngazidja.

References
 World Statesmen.org

States and territories disestablished in 1886
Former countries in Africa
History of the Comoros